Stavoren is a terminus railway station in Stavoren, Netherlands. The station opened on 28 November 1885 and is the southern terminus of the Leeuwarden–Stavoren railway. Train services are operated by Arriva.

Between 1943 and 1979, the station was called Staveren.

Major destinations
For most places in the Netherlands, travel to Leeuwarden. From Stavoren, there is a ferry to Enkhuizen.

Train services

Bus services

Boat services

Accident
On 25 July 2010 a maintenance train collided with a buffer stop at the station. The train rammed a small shop, passed through it and stopped at the square behind it. Only two people were injured, out of four people on the train. The accident happened late at night, when passenger services had already finished. Aerial photographs of the accident show several wagons dispersed across the platform, indicating the collision took place at high speed.

The Dutch Safety Board investigated the accident and concluded on 13 September 2011 that the direct cause of the accident was a combination of two factors: the train driver had not seen a signal and the ATB train protection system did not succeed in stopping the train either. The driver missed the signal because he was unfamiliar with the route, because the work plan contained errors, because some signs along the route were missing, because the signal was unusual, and because he was distracted. The ATB was unsuccessful because the systems on the train and along the track were incompatible, and because the ATB had been automatically switched to a less restrictive mode. The underlying cause was identified by the Board as a lack of attention to safety among the companies involved.

See also
 List of railway stations in Friesland

Gallery

References

External links
Arriva website 
Dutch Public Transport journey planner 

Railway stations in Friesland
Railway stations opened in 1885